Federico Pérez Silvera (born January 23, 1986 in Montevideo, Uruguay) is a Uruguayan footballer who currently plays for Plaza Colonia.

During 2009-2010 Pérez played for Everton in Chile.

Honours
Sud América
Uruguayan Segunda División: 2012–13

External links

1986 births
Living people
Uruguayan footballers
Uruguayan expatriate footballers
Association football defenders
Peñarol players
C.A. Bella Vista players
Santiago Wanderers footballers
Everton de Viña del Mar footballers
Club Atlético River Plate (Montevideo) players
Sud América players
Plaza Colonia players
Club y Biblioteca Ramón Santamarina footballers
Expatriate footballers in Argentina
Expatriate footballers in Chile